Jared Andrew Cohen (born November 24, 1981) is an American businessman currently serving as the President of Global Affairs and co-head of the Office of Applied Innovation at Goldman Sachs, where he joined in August 2022 as a Partner and member of the firm's Management Committee. He is also an Adjunct Senior Fellow at the Council on Foreign Relations. Previously, he was the founder and the CEO of Jigsaw (formerly Google Ideas). Prior to that, he served as a member of the Secretary of State's Policy Planning Staff and as an advisor to Condoleezza Rice and later Hillary Clinton. Initially brought in by Condoleezza Rice as a member of the Policy Planning Staff, he was one of a few staffers that stayed under Hillary Clinton. In this capacity, he focused on counter-terrorism, counter-radicalization, Middle East/South Asia, Internet freedom, and fostering opposition in repressive countries.

According to The New York Times Magazine, right before his departure Cohen was one of the participating architects of what was labeled in 2010 as "21st century statecraft" along with Richard Boly and several foreign service officers in the Department of State's Office of eDiplomacy In 2013, Cohen was named by Time as one of its 100 most influential people.

Early life and education
Cohen was born to a Jewish family in Weston, Connecticut. Cohen received a bachelor's degree from Stanford University in 2004. He majored in history and political science and minored in African studies. He subsequently earned a master's degree in international relations from Oxford University, where he studied as a Rhodes Scholar.

Career
Before graduating college, Cohen pursued interests in government and in mass media. He was an intern at the U.S. State Department.

U.S. State Department
Following his internship and graduation, Cohen served as a member of the Secretary of State's Policy Planning Staff from 2006 to 2010. He was 24 years of age. His service began after his internship under former U.S. Secretary of State Condoleezza Rice, during the Bush Administration.

Cohen was one of the few members of Policy Planning kept on by Secretary of State Hillary Clinton. He played a role in helping shape counter-radicalization strategies and advised on US policy towards Iran and the Middle East. Beginning in April 2009, Cohen aided delegations focused on connecting technology executives with local stakeholders in Iraq, Russia, Mexico, Congo, and Syria.

In the midst of the June 2009 protests in Iran, Cohen sought to support the opposition in Iran. He contacted Twitter, requesting that the company not perform planned maintenance that would have temporarily shut down service in Iran, because the protestors were using Twitter to maintain contact with the outside world. According to The New Yorker Ryan Lizza, "The move violated Obama's rule of non-interference, and White House officials were furious." In an interview with Clinton, she "did not betray any disagreement with the President over Iran policy," but "cited Cohen's move with pride."

While serving on the Policy Planning Staff, Cohen became an advisor to Richard Holbrooke, who was the first Special Representative for Afghanistan and Pakistan. He took several trips with Holbrooke to Afghanistan, where he helped develop some of the early strategic communications strategies.

Cohen was among the early adopters of social media in the U.S. government. In April 2010, Cohen had the third largest number of Twitter followers in the US government, behind Barack Obama and John McCain. By September 2013, he was no longer in the top 20.

Google

Cohen left the State Department's Policy Planning staff on 2 September 2010. On 7 September 2010, Cohen became an adjunct senior fellow at The Council on Foreign Relations focusing on counter-radicalization. He was hired as the first director of Google Ideas, a new branch within Google, in mid-October 2010. With the creation of Alphabet, Google Ideas spun out into Jigsaw, which Cohen founded and now leads as CEO. Jigsaw is tasked with "invest[ing] in and build[ing] technology to address humanity's most intractable problems, from countering violent extremism to online censorship, to expand[ing] access to information for the world’s most vulnerable populations and to defend[ing] against the world’s most challenging security threats."

According to a Fast Company article, "Jigsaw’s employees are a mix of engineers and researchers, who have built out a portfolio of more than a dozen products."

Wired wrote that "The New York–based think tank and tech incubator aims to build products that use Google's massive infrastructure and engineering muscle not to advance the best possibilities of the Internet but to fix the worst of it: surveillance, extremist indoctrination, censorship."

According to a 2019 Vice Motherboard report, "Current and former Jigsaw employees describe a toxic workplace environment, mismanagement, poor leadership, HR complaints that haven't resulted in action, retaliation against employees who speak up, and a chronic failure to retain talent, particularly women engineers and researchers. Sources describe a place full of well-intentioned people who are undermined by their own leaders; an organization that, despite the breathless headlines it has garnered, has done little to actually make the internet any better."

In June 2022, Cohen addressed the UN Security Council, warning that Russian cyberattacks, disinformation and other forms of information warfare being waged in Ukraine are a “crystal ball” for future problems elsewhere. He called for states to "find a way to turn the volume down and settle on some kind of deterrence doctrine for the cyber domain."

In a July 2012 email to members of Clinton's team Cohen reportedly sent to Clinton said: “My team is planning to launch a tool on Sunday that will publicly track and map the defections in Syria and which parts of the government they are coming from.”

Techno-democracy
According to the Washington Posts David Ignatius, the concept of "techno-democracy" was first articulated in detail in a November article in Foreign Affairs, which Cohen co-authored with Richard Fontaine. "The concept is anchored on the creation of a 'T-12' group of advanced democracies that would work together to compete with China on issues related to technology." Ignatius writes, "it has the strong backing of Secretary of State Antony Blinken and National Security Advisor Jake Sullivan."

Goldman Sachs
In July 2022, Goldman Sachs CEO David Solomon announced that the firm had hired Cohen as the firm's President of Global Affairs and co-head of a new Office of Applied Innovation. Cohen officially joined in August as a Partner and member of the firm's Management Committee.

Books

The New Digital Age
The New Digital Age: Re-shaping the Future of People, Nations and Business co-authored with Google Executive Chairman Eric Schmidt, was a New York Times bestseller. The book considers the geopolitical future when 5 billion additional people come online, and the presumed terrorism, war, identity theft, conflict and altered relations between nations that the authors say will result. The book grew out of an article, "The Digital Disruption", which was published in Foreign Affairs magazine in November 2010. Cohen and Schmidt suggest that technology will rewrite the relationship between states and their citizens in the 21st century.

Julian Assange wrote critically of the book:

Another critical review by Evgeny Morozov in The New Republic stated:

Accidental Presidents
Accidental Presidents: Eight Men Who Changed America was written by Cohen in 2019 and is a New York Times Bestseller. According to the Guardian it is "a history of eight vice-presidents who stepped up when their president was removed by fate. It covers the assassinations everyone knows, Lincoln and Kennedy, those some may not, Garfield and McKinley, and what happened when presidents died from natural causes: Harrison, Taylor, Harding, Roosevelt."

Early books
Cohen's first book, One Hundred Days of Silence: America and the Rwanda Genocide, was published in 2006 by Rowman & Littlefield and chronicles U.S. policy toward Rwanda during the 1994 Genocide.

His second book, Children of Jihad: A Young American's Travels Among the Youth of the Middle East, was published by Penguin Books (Gotham) in October 2007 and has also been published as an audio book and translated into Dutch and Italian.

He and co-author Eric Schmidt published "The Dark Side of the Digital Revolution" in the Wall Street Journal in 2013, and a 2012 article for The Washington Post, entitled "Technology Can Be Harnessed to Fight Drug Cartels in Mexico," which grew out of a trip the two took to Ciudad Juárez.

Other activities
Cohen has been involved in the Tribeca Film Festival, serving as a juror in multiple categories over a number of years.

Personal
He is married to Rebecca Zubaty.

References

1981 births
Living people
Alumni of St John's College, Oxford
American non-fiction writers
American Rhodes Scholars
George W. Bush administration personnel
Google employees
Jewish American writers
Obama administration personnel
Stanford University alumni
United States Department of State officials
People from Weston, Connecticut